Richard Habersham may refer to:
 Richard W. Habersham, U.S. Representative from Georgia
 Richard Parnell Habersham, American actor